Marcel Fernand Thévenet (9 July 1915 – 3 February 1990) was a French weightlifter. He competed at the 1948 Summer Olympics and the 1952 Summer Olympics.

References

1915 births
1990 deaths
French male weightlifters
Olympic weightlifters of France
Weightlifters at the 1948 Summer Olympics
Weightlifters at the 1952 Summer Olympics
Sportspeople from Poitiers
20th-century French people